California Pacific School of Theology is a higher-education Christian theological school in the United States non-accredited at this time, issuing religious degrees in West Hills, California. The school offers distance education for Graduate and Undergraduate programs.

History
California Pacific School of Theology was chartered in 1998, however the history of the school dates farther back and is linked with the institutions California Graduate School of Theology (Cal Grad) and California Center for Theological Studies (CCTS).

Cal Grad was established in 1969 by Dr. William Steuart McBirnie and continues to function to this day. A Korean interest obtained ownership of Cal Grad in 1987, which at that time I.D.E. Thomas detached and established a school functioning under the name California Center for Theological Studies (CCTS). CCTS operated out of First Baptist Church of Maywood CA for 12 years until the retirement of Dr. Thomas from that organization.

At that time, the decision was made to broaden the regional scope of the school, and the name was changed to California Pacific School of Theology. While the school organization remained the same, the school was then chartered under the new name and functioned in Glendale, CA at the facilities of United Community Church, the establishment founded by Dr. McBirnie and original founder of Cal Grad.

CPSOT utilized the facilities of United Community Church in Glendale for 14 years. In 2012, due to changes with United Community Church, CPSOT opted to change location to West Hills, CA and offer online educational programs, along with occasional satellite campus courses.

On January 29, 2021, California Pacific School of Theology closed its doors.

In an announcement made on their Facebook page, President Bill Forges cites that the COVID-19 pandemic was an additional burden that added to the tenuous circumstances the school was operating under, and the closure is made acknowledging the realities of the times.

CPSOT functioned as their own independent charter from 1998 through 2021.

Theology
California Pacific School of Theology is a Christian, non-denominational school and is known for holding conservative evangelical doctrine. This includes belief in the divine, inerrant inspiration of the Bible, The Triune nature of God (Trinity), the deity of Jesus Christ, and the doctrine of salvation by grace.

Programs
California Pacific School of Theology offers both Undergraduate and Graduate programs in Christian Theology. Degrees offered are currently Bachelors, Masters, Doctor of Ministry (D.Min.), and Doctor of Philosophy (Ph.D.).

California Pacific School of Theology is a religious non-profit corporation, registered by the State of California, as recorded, December 9, 1998.  As such it has degree granting authority under the California Bureau for Private Postsecondary Education (BPPE). BPPE approval is not accreditation, only an oversight agency in California for private and for profit schools.

References

External links
 
 California Pacific School of Theology website - Old website archived June 8, 2007

Education in Los Angeles
Universities and colleges in Los Angeles County, California
Seminaries and theological colleges in California
Evangelical seminaries and theological colleges in the United States
Educational institutions established in 1998
Evangelicalism in California
1998 establishments in California
Nondenominational Christian universities and colleges in the United States